Oh My God is the fifth studio album by American indie rock musician Kevin Morby, released on April 26, 2019, on Dead Oceans.

Critical reception

Oh My God received universal acclaim from contemporary music critics. At Metacritic, which assigns a normalized rating of 0-100 based on reviews from mainstream critics, the album received an average score of 81, based on 20 reviews.

Track listing

Charts

References

2019 albums
Kevin Morby albums
Dead Oceans albums